Petrilli is a surname. Notable people with the surname include:

Aristide Petrilli (1868-1930?), Italian sculptor
Frank J. Petrilli, American business executive
Giuseppe Petrilli (1913?–1999?), Italian professor and European Commissioner
Savina Petrilli (1851–1923), Italian Roman Catholic professed religious
Susan Petrilli (born 1954), Italian semiotician